The Chairman of the Legislative Assembly of Krasnoyarsk Krai is the presiding officer of that legislature.

Office-holders 
Stanislav Yermachenko 1994–1998
Aleksandr Uss  1998–2017
Dmitry Sviridov 2017–2021
Alexey Dodatko 2021–

Lists of legislative speakers in Russia
Politics of Krasnoyarsk Krai